The 1994 La Flèche Wallonne was the 58th edition of La Flèche Wallonne cycle race and was held on 20 April 1994. The race started in Spa and finished in Huy. The race was won by Moreno Argentin of the Gewiss–Ballan team. Argentin and his teammates, Giorgio Furlan and Evgeni Berzin had escaped from the pack  from the finish, never to be caught again.

Following the race, suspicion arose around the dominant performance of the Gewiss riders. Their team doctor, Michele Ferrari, was interviewed by French newspaper L'Equipe the morning after the race and asked about erythropoietin (EPO), a substance used for purposes of doping. Speaking about the dangers of EPO, Ferrari commented that he did not consider it more dangerous than "ten litres of orange juice".

General classification

References

1994 in road cycling
1994
1994 in Belgian sport
April 1994 sports events in Europe